Richard Joseph Cooke (1853—1931) was a bishop of the Methodist Episcopal Church, South, elected in 1912.  He also distinguished himself as a pastor, an editor, a theologian, an author, and a university administrator.

Early life
Richard was born January 31, 1853, in New York, the son of Richard and Joana (née Geary) Cooke.  He came South at an early age, working as a timekeeper for a railroad construction company for a time.

Richard married Eliza Gettys Fisher April 20, 1881. They had four children. She died in 1904. Then he married Ella B. Fisher in 1908 (his first wife's sister).

Education
Richard graduated in 1880 from East Tennessee Wesleyan University.  He afterwards studied at the University of Berlin, Germany.  The University of Tennessee awarded him the honorary degree D.D.  Likewise, Willamette University awarded the LL.D.

Ordained ministry
Richard was admitted to the Central Tennessee Annual Conference of the M.E. Church, South in 1873.  He also served as a pastor in the Holston Conference, where he served the Cleveland, Tennessee church, and First Methodist of Knoxville.  He also taught at both Athens University and Chattanooga University.  Later he was also the editor of the Methodist Advocate Journal.

Death and burial
A break in his health led to his retirement in 1920.  Yet his influence continued to be felt throughout Methodism.  He died Christmas Day, December 25, 1931.  He was buried at Athens, Tennessee.

References
 Price, Carl F., Compiler and Editor:  Who's Who in American Methodism, New York:  E.B. Treat & Co., 1916.
 Leete, Frederick DeLand, Methodist bishops.  Nashville, The Methodist Publishing House, 1948.
 Sketches of Holston Preachers

See also
List of bishops of the United Methodist Church

1853 births
1931 deaths
American Methodist bishops
Bishops of the Methodist Episcopal Church, South
Editors of Christian publications
American newspaper editors
Methodist theologians
American theologians
20th-century Methodist bishops